Elizabeth Short (July 29, 1924 – , 1947), known posthumously as the Black Dahlia, was an American woman found murdered in the Leimert Park neighborhood of Los Angeles on January 15, 1947. Her case became highly publicized owing to the gruesome nature of the crime, which included the mutilation of her corpse, which was bisected at the waist.

A native of Boston, Short spent her early life in New England and Florida before relocating to California, where her father lived. It is commonly held that Short was an aspiring actress, though she had no known acting credits or jobs during her time in Los Angeles. She would acquire the nickname of the Black Dahlia posthumously, as newspapers of the period often nicknamed particularly lurid crimes; the term may have originated from a film noir murder mystery, The Blue Dahlia, released in 1946. After the discovery of her body, the Los Angeles Police Department (LAPD) began an extensive investigation that produced over 150 suspects but yielded no arrests.

Short's unsolved murder and the details surrounding it have had a lasting cultural intrigue, generating various theories and public speculation. Her life and death have been the basis of numerous books and films, and her murder is frequently cited as one of the most famous unsolved murders in American history, as well as one of the oldest unsolved cases in Los Angeles County. It has likewise been credited by historians as one of the first major crimes in post–World War II America to capture national attention.

Life

Childhood
Elizabeth Short was born on July 29, 1924, in the Hyde Park section of Boston, Massachusetts, the third of five daughters of Cleo A. Short and wife Phoebe May Sawyer. In 1927 the Short family briefly relocated to Portland, Maine, before settling in Medford, a suburb of Boston, that same year. Short's father built miniature golf courses until he lost most of his savings in the 1929 stock market crash. In 1930, his car was found abandoned on the Charlestown Bridge, and it was assumed that he had jumped into the Charles River. Believing her husband to be deceased, Short's mother began working as a bookkeeper to support the family.

Troubled by bronchitis and severe asthma attacks, Short underwent lung surgery at age 15, after which doctors suggested she periodically relocate to a milder climate to prevent further respiratory problems. Short's mother sent her to spend winters in Miami, Florida, with family friends for the next three years. In her sophomore year, Short dropped out of Medford High School.

Relocation to California

In late 1942, Short's mother received a letter of apology from her presumed-deceased husband, which revealed that he was in fact alive and had started a new life in California. In December, at age 18, Short relocated to Vallejo, California, to live with her father, whom she had not seen since age 6. At the time he was working at the nearby Mare Island Naval Shipyard on San Francisco Bay. Arguments between Short and her father led to her moving out in January 1943. 

Short took a job at the Base Exchange at Camp Cooke (now Vandenberg Space Force Base) near Lompoc, briefly living with a U.S. Army Air Force sergeant who reportedly abused her. She left Lompoc in mid-1943 and moved to Santa Barbara, where she was arrested on September 23, 1943, for drinking at a local bar while underage. The juvenile authorities sent her back to Massachusetts but she returned instead to Florida, making only occasional visits to her family near Boston.

While in Florida, Short met Major Matthew Michael Gordon, Jr., a decorated Army Air Force officer of the 2nd Air Commando Group, who was training for deployment to Southeast Asian theater of World War II. Short later told friends that Gordon had written to propose marriage while he was recovering from injuries from a plane crash in India. She accepted his offer, but Gordon died in a second crash on August 10, 1945, less than a week before the end of the war.

In July 1946, Short relocated to Los Angeles to visit Army Air Force Lieutenant Joseph Gordon Fickling, an acquaintance from Florida, who was stationed at the Naval Reserve Air Base in Long Beach. Short spent the last six months of her life in southern California, mostly in the Los Angeles area; shortly before her death she had been working as a waitress, and rented a room behind the Florentine Gardens nightclub on Hollywood Boulevard. She has been variously described and depicted as an aspiring or "would-be" actress. According to some sources, she did in fact have aspirations to be a film star, though she had no known acting jobs or credits.

Murder

Prior to murder
On January 9, 1947, Short returned to her home in Los Angeles after a brief trip to San Diego with Robert "Red" Manley, a 25-year-old married salesman she had been dating. Manley stated that he dropped Short off at the Biltmore Hotel in downtown Los Angeles, and that Short was to meet her sister, who was visiting from Boston, that afternoon. By some accounts, staff of the Biltmore recalled having seen Short using the lobby telephone.

Discovery
On the morning of January 15, 1947, Short's naked body, severed into two pieces, was found in a vacant lot on the west side of South Norton Avenue, midway between Coliseum Street and West 39th Street (at ) in the neighborhood of Leimert Park. At the time, Leimert Park was largely undeveloped. Local resident Betty Bersinger discovered the body at approximately 10 a.m. while walking with her three-year-old daughter, initially thinking she had found a discarded store mannequin. When she realized it was a corpse, she rushed to a nearby house and telephoned the police.

Short's severely mutilated body was completely severed at the waist and drained of blood, leaving her skin a pallid white. Medical examiners determined that she had been dead for around ten hours prior to the discovery, leaving her time of death either sometime during the evening of January 14 or the early morning hours of January 15. The body had apparently been washed by the killer. Short's face had been slashed from the corners of her mouth to her ears, creating an effect known as the "Glasgow smile". She had several cuts on her thigh and breasts, where entire portions of flesh had been sliced away. The lower half of her body was positioned a foot away from the upper, and her intestines had been tucked neatly beneath her buttocks. The corpse had been "posed", with her hands over her head, her elbows bent at right angles, and her legs spread apart.

Upon the discovery, a crowd of passersby and reporters began to gather; Los Angeles Herald-Express reporter Aggie Underwood was among the first to arrive at the scene, and took several photos of the corpse and crime scene. Near the body, detectives located a heel print on the ground amid the tire tracks, and a cement sack containing watery blood was also found nearby.

Autopsy and identification
An autopsy of Short's body was performed on January 16, 1947, by Frederick Newbarr, the Los Angeles County coroner. There were ligature marks on her ankles, wrists, and neck, and an "irregular laceration with superficial tissue loss" on her right breast. Newbarr also noted superficial lacerations on the right forearm, left upper arm, and the lower left side of the chest.

The body had been cut completely in half by a technique taught in the 1930s called a hemicorporectomy. The lower half of her body had been removed by transecting the lumbar spine between the second and third lumbar vertebrae, thus severing the intestine at the duodenum. Newbarr's report noted "very little" ecchymosis (bruising) along the incision line, suggesting it had been performed after death. The skull was not fractured, but there was bruising noted on the front and right side of her scalp, with a small amount of bleeding in the subarachnoid space on the right side, consistent with blows to the head. The cause of death was determined to be hemorrhaging from the lacerations to her face and the shock from blows to the head and face. Samples were taken from her body testing for the presence of sperm, but the results came back negative.

Short was identified after her fingerprints were sent to the FBI via Soundphoto, a device which transmitted images by telephone and was normally used for news photographs; Short's fingerprints were on file from her 1943 arrest. Immediately following Short's identification, reporters from William Randolph Hearst's Los Angeles Examiner contacted her mother, Phoebe Short, in Boston, and told her that her daughter had won a beauty contest. It was only after prying as much personal information as they could from Phoebe that the reporters revealed that her daughter had in fact been murdered. The newspaper offered to pay her airfare and accommodations if she would travel to Los Angeles to help with the police investigation. That was yet another ploy since the newspaper kept her away from police and other reporters to protect its scoop. The Examiner and another Hearst newspaper, the Los Angeles Herald-Express, later sensationalized the case, with one article from the Examiner describing the black tailored suit Short was last seen wearing as "a tight skirt and a sheer blouse". The media nicknamed her the "Black Dahlia", and described her as an "adventuress" who "prowled Hollywood Boulevard". Additional newspaper reports, such as one published in the Los Angeles Times on January 17, deemed the murder a "sex fiend slaying".

Investigation

Initial investigation

Letters and interviews
On January 21, 1947, a person claiming to be Short's killer placed a phone call to the office of James Richardson, the editor of the Examiner, congratulating Richardson on the newspaper's coverage of the case, and stated he planned on eventually turning himself in, but not before allowing police to pursue him further. Additionally, the caller told Richardson to "expect some souvenirs of Beth Short in the mail".

On January 24, a suspicious manila envelope was discovered by a U.S. Postal Service worker. The envelope had been addressed to "The Los Angeles Examiner and other Los Angeles papers" with individual words that had been cut-and-pasted from newspaper clippings; additionally, a large message on the face of the envelope read: "Here is Dahlia's belongings [,] letter to follow". The envelope contained Short's birth certificate, business cards, photographs, names written on pieces of paper, and an address book with the name Mark Hansen embossed on the cover. The packet had been carefully cleaned with gasoline, similarly to Short's body, which led police to suspect the packet had been sent directly by her killer. Despite the efforts to clean the packet, several partial fingerprints were lifted from the envelope and sent to the Federal Bureau of Investigation for testing; however, the prints were compromised in transit and thus could not be properly analyzed. The same day the packet was received by the Examiner, a handbag and a black suede shoe were reported to have been seen on top of a garbage can in an alley a short distance from Norton Avenue,  from where Short's body had been discovered. The items were recovered by police, but they had also been wiped clean with gasoline, destroying any fingerprints.

On March 14, an apparent suicide note scrawled in pencil on a bit of paper was found tucked in a shoe in a pile of men's clothing by the ocean's edge at the foot of Breeze Ave., Venice. The note read: "To whom it may concern: I have waited for the police to capture me for the Black Dahlia killing, but have not. I am too much of a coward to turn myself in, so this is the best way out for me. I couldn't help myself for that, or this. Sorry, Mary." The pile of clothing was first seen by a beach caretaker, who reported the discovery to John Dillon, lifeguard captain. Dillon immediately notified Capt. L. E. Christensen of West Los Angeles Police Station. The clothes included a coat and trousers of blue herringbone tweed, a brown and white T shirt, white jockey shorts, tan socks and tan moccasin leisure shoes, size about eight. The clothes gave no clue about the identity of their owner.

Police quickly deemed Mark Hansen, the owner of the address book found in the packet, a suspect. Hansen was a wealthy local nightclub and theater owner and an acquaintance at whose home Short had stayed with friends, and according to some sources, he also confirmed that the purse and shoe discovered in the alley were in fact Short's. Ann Toth, Short's friend and roommate, told investigators that Short had recently rejected sexual advances from Hansen, and suggested it as potential cause for him to kill her; however, he was cleared of suspicion in the case. In addition to Hansen, the Los Angeles Police Department interviewed over 150 men in the ensuing weeks whom they believed to be potential suspects. Manley, who had been one of the last people to see Short alive, was also investigated, but was cleared of suspicion after passing numerous polygraph examinations. Police also interviewed several persons found listed in Hansen's address book, including Martin Lewis, who had been an acquaintance of Short's. Lewis was able to provide an alibi for the date of Short's murder, as he was in Portland, Oregon, visiting his father-in-law, who was dying of kidney failure.

A total of 750 investigators from the LAPD and other departments worked on the case during its initial stages, including 400 sheriff's deputies and 250 California State Patrol officers. Various locations were searched for potential evidence, including storm drains throughout Los Angeles, abandoned structures, and various sites along the Los Angeles River, but the searches yielded no further evidence. City councilman Lloyd G. Davis posted a  reward for information leading police to Short's killer. After the announcement of the reward, various persons came forward with confessions, most of which police dismissed as false. Several of the false confessors were charged with obstruction of justice.

Media response; decline
On January 26, another letter was received by the Examiner, this time handwritten, which read: "Here it is. Turning in Wed., Jan. 29, 10 am. Had my fun at police. Black Dahlia Avenger". The letter also named a location at which the supposed killer would turn himself in. Police waited at the location on the morning of January 29, but the alleged killer did not appear. Instead, at 1:00pm, the Examiner offices received another cut-and-pasted letter, which read: "Have changed my mind. You would not give me a square deal. Dahlia killing was justified."

The graphic nature of the crime and the subsequent letters received by the Examiner had resulted in a media frenzy surrounding Short's murder. Both local and national publications covered the story heavily, many of which reprinted sensationalistic reports suggesting that Short had been tortured for hours prior to her death; the information, however, was false, yet police allowed the reports to circulate so as to conceal Short's true cause of death—cerebral hemorrhage—from the public. Further reports about Short's personal life were publicized, including details about her alleged declining of Hansen's romantic advances; additionally, a stripper who was an acquaintance of Short's told police that she "liked to get guys worked up over her, but she'd leave them hanging dry." This led some reporters (namely the Herald-Expresss Bevo Means) and detectives to look into the possibility that Short was a lesbian, and begin questioning employees and patrons of gay bars in Los Angeles; this claim, however, remained unsubstantiated. The Herald-Express also received several letters from the purported killer, again made with cut-and-pasted clippings, one of which read: "I will give up on Dahlia killing if I get 10 years. Don't try to find me."

On February 1, the Los Angeles Daily News reported that the case had "run into a Stone Wall", with no new leads for investigators to pursue. The Examiner continued to run stories on the murder and the investigation, which was front-page news for 35 days following the discovery of the body.

When interviewed, lead investigator Captain Jack Donahue told the press that he believed Short's murder had taken place in a remote building or shack on the outskirts of Los Angeles, and her body transported into the city where it was disposed of. Based on the precise cuts and dissection of Short's corpse, the LAPD looked into the possibility that the murderer had been a surgeon, doctor, or someone with medical knowledge. In mid-February 1947, the LAPD served a warrant to the University of Southern California Medical School, which was located near the site where Short's body had been discovered, requesting a complete list of the program's students. The university agreed so long as the students' identities remained private. Background checks were conducted, but yielded no results.

Grand jury and aftermath

By the spring of 1947, Short's murder had become a cold case with few new leads. Sergeant Finis Brown, one of the lead detectives on the case, blamed the press for compromising the investigation through reporters' probing of details and unverified reporting. In September 1949, a grand jury convened to discuss inadequacies in the LAPD's homicide unit based on their failure to solve numerous murders—especially those of women and children—in the past several years, Short's being one of them. In the aftermath of the grand jury, further investigation was done on Short's past, with detectives tracing her movements between Massachusetts, California, and Florida, and also interviewed people who knew her in Texas and New Orleans. However, the interviews yielded no useful information in the murder.

Suspects and confessions

The notoriety of Short's murder has spurred a large number of confessions over the years, many of which have been deemed false. During the initial investigation into her murder, police received a total of 60 confessions, most made by men. Since that time, over 500 people have confessed to the crime, some of whom had not even been born at the time of her death. Sergeant John P. St. John, a detective who worked the case until his retirement, stated, "It is amazing how many people offer up a relative as the killer."

In 2003, Ralph Asdel, one of the original detectives on the case, told the Times that he believed he had interviewed Short's killer, a man who had been seen with his sedan parked near the vacant lot where her body was discovered in the early morning hours of January 15, 1947. A neighbor driving by that day stopped to dispose of a bag of lawn clippings in the vacant lot when he saw a parked sedan, allegedly with its right rear door open; the driver of the sedan was standing in the lot. His arrival apparently startled the owner of the sedan, who approached his car and peered in the window before returning to the sedan and driving away. The owner of the sedan was followed to a local restaurant where he worked, but was ultimately cleared of suspicion.

Suspects remaining under discussion by various authors and experts include a doctor named Walter Bayley, proposed by the former Times copyeditor Larry Harnisch; Times publisher Norman Chandler, whom biographer Donald Wolfe claims impregnated Short; Leslie Dillon, Joseph A. Dumais, Artie Lane (a.k.a. Jeff Connors), Mark Hansen, Dr. Francis E. Sweeney, Woody Guthrie, Bugsy Siegel, Orson Welles, George Hodel, Hodel's friend Fred Sexton, George Knowlton, Robert M. "Red" Manley, Patrick S. O'Reilly, and Jack Anderson Wilson.

George Hill Hodel Jr. was a suspect; like the others, he was never formally charged with the crime.  He came to wider attention as a suspect after his death when he was accused by his son, Los Angeles homicide detective Steve Hodel, of killing Short and committing several additional murders. Prior to the Dahlia case, he was also a suspect in the death of his secretary, Ruth Spaulding, but was not charged; and was accused of raping his own daughter, Tamar, but acquitted. He fled the country several times, and spent 1950 to 1990 in the Philippines.

Theories and potentially related crimes

Several crime authors, as well as Cleveland detective Peter Merylo, have suspected a link between the Short murder and the Cleveland Torso Murders, which took place in Cleveland, Ohio, between 1934 and 1938. As part of their investigation into other murders that took place before and after the Short killing, the original LAPD investigators studied the Torso Murders in 1947 but later discounted any relationship between the two cases. In 1980, new evidence implicating a former Torso Murder suspect, Jack Anderson Wilson (a.k.a. Arnold Smith), was investigated by Detective St. John in relation to Short's murder. He claimed he was close to arresting Wilson for Short's murder, but that Wilson died in a fire on February 4, 1982. The possible connection between Short's murder and the Torso Murders received renewed media attention when it was profiled on the NBC series Unsolved Mysteries in 1992, in which Eliot Ness biographer Oscar Fraley suggested Ness knew the identity of the killer responsible for both cases.

The February 10, 1947, murder of Jeanne French in Los Angeles was also considered by the media and detectives as possibly being connected to Short's killing. French's body was discovered in west Los Angeles on Grand View Boulevard, nude and badly beaten. Written on her stomach in lipstick was what appeared to say "Fuck You B.D.", and the letters "TEX" below. The Herald-Express covered the story heavily, and drew comparisons to the Short murder less than a month prior, surmising the initials "B.D." to stand for "Black Dahlia". According to historian Jon Lewis, however, the scrawling actually read "P.D.", ostensibly standing for "police department".

Crime authors such as Steve Hodel (son of George Hill Hodel) and William Rasmussen have suggested a link between the Short murder and the 1946 murder and dismemberment of six-year-old Suzanne Degnan in Chicago, Illinois. Captain Donahoe of the LAPD stated publicly that he believed the Black Dahlia and the Chicago Lipstick Murders were "likely connected". Among the evidence cited is the fact that Short's body was found on Norton Avenue, three blocks west of Degnan Boulevard, Degnan being the last name of the girl from Chicago. There were also striking similarities between the handwriting on the Degnan ransom note and that of the "Black Dahlia Avenger". Both texts used a combination of capitals and small letters (the Degnan note read in part "BuRN This FoR heR SAfTY" ), and both notes contain a similar misshapen letter P and have one word that matches exactly. Convicted serial killer William Heirens served life in prison for Degnan's murder. Initially arrested at 17 for breaking into a residence close to that of Degnan, Heirens claimed he was tortured by police, forced to confess, and made a scapegoat for the murder. After being taken from the medical infirmary at the Dixon Correctional Center on February 26, 2012, for health problems, Heirens died at the University of Illinois Medical Center on March 5, 2012, at 83.

Additionally, Steve Hodel has implicated his father, George Hodel, as Short's killer, citing his father's training as a surgeon as circumstantial evidence. In 2003, it was revealed in notes from the 1949 grand jury report that investigators had wiretapped Hodel's home, and obtained recorded conversation of him with an unidentified visitor, saying: "Supposin' I did kill the Black Dahlia. They couldn't prove it now. They can't talk to my secretary because she's dead. They thought there was something fishy. Anyway, now they may have figured it out. Killed her. Maybe I did kill my secretary."

In 1991, Janice Knowlton, a woman who was ten years old at the time of Short's murder, claimed that she witnessed her father, George Knowlton, beat Short to death with a clawhammer in the detached garage of her family's home in Westminster. She also published a book titled Daddy was the Black Dahlia Killer in 1995, in which she made additional claims that her father sexually molested her. The book was condemned as "trash" by Knowlton's stepsister Jolane Emerson in 2004, who stated: "She believed it, but it wasn't reality. I know, because I lived with her father for sixteen years." Additionally, Detective St. John told the Times that Knowlton's claims were "not consistent with the facts of the case".

John Gilmore's 1994 book Severed: The True Story of the Black Dahlia Murder, suggests a possible connection between Short's murder and that of Georgette Bauerdorf, a socialite who was strangled to death in her West Hollywood home in 1944. Gilmore suggests that Short's employment at the Hollywood Canteen, where Bauerdorf also worked as a hostess, could be a potential connection between the two women. However, the claim that Short ever worked at the Hollywood Canteen has been disputed by others, such as the retired Times copyeditor Larry Harnisch (see Rumors and factual disputes).

The 2017 book Black Dahlia, Red Rose by Piu Eatwell focuses on Leslie Dillon, a bellhop who was a former mortician's assistant; his associates Mark Hansen and Jeff Connors; and Sergeant Finis Brown, a lead detective who had links to Hansen and was allegedly corrupt. Eatwell posits that Short was murdered because she knew too much about the men's involvement in a scheme for robbing hotels. She further suggests that Short was killed at the Aster Motel in Los Angeles, where the owners reported finding one of their rooms "covered in blood and fecal matter" on the morning Short's body was found. The Examiner stated in 1949 that LA Police Chief William A. Worton denied that the Flower Street [Aster] Motel had anything to do with the case, although its rival newspaper, the Los Angeles Herald, claimed that the murder took place there. Eatwell was working on a television documentary, and a revised edition of her book was due to be released in the autumn of 2018.

In 2000, Buz Williams, a retired detective with the Long Beach Police Department, wrote an article for the LBPD newsletter The Rap Sheet on Short's murder. Williams' father, Richard F. Williams, and his friend, Con Keller, were both members of LA's Gangster Squad investigating the case. Williams Sr believed that Dillon was the killer, and that when Dillon returned to his home state of Oklahoma, he was able to avoid extradition to California because his ex-wife Georgia Stevenson was second cousins with Governor Adlai Stevenson II of Illinois, who contacted the governor of Oklahoma on Dillon's behalf. Keller believed Hansen was the killer, as he had studied at a surgical school in Sweden and had thrown elaborate parties attended by prominent LAPD officials. Williams' article says that Dillon sued the LAPD for $3 million, but that the suit was dropped. Harnisch disputes this, claiming that Dillon was cleared by police after an exhaustive investigation, and that the District Attorney's files positively placed him in San Francisco when Short was killed. Harnisch claims that there was no LAPD coverup, and that Dillon did in fact receive a financial settlement from the City of Los Angeles, but has not produced concrete evidence to prove this.

Rumors and factual disputes
Numerous details regarding Short's personal life and death have been points of public dispute. The eager involvement of both the public and press in solving her murder have been credited as factors that complicated the investigation significantly, resulting in a complex, sometimes inconsistent narrative of events. According to Anne Marie DiStefano of the Portland Tribune, many "unsubstantiated stories" have circulated about Short over the years: "She was a prostitute, she was frigid, she was pregnant, she was a lesbian. And somehow, instead of fading away over time, the legend of the Black Dahlia just keeps getting more convoluted." Harnisch has refuted several supposed rumors and popular conceptions about Short and her murder and also disputed the validity of Gilmore's book Severed, claiming the book is "25% mistakes, and 50% fiction". Harnisch also had examined the district attorney's files (he claimed that Steve Hodel has examined some of them pertaining to his father, along with Times columnist Steve Lopez) and contrary to Eatwell's claims, the files showed that Dillon was thoroughly investigated and was determined to have been in San Francisco when Short was killed. Harnisch speculated that Eatwell either did not find these files or she chose to ignore them.

Murder and state of the body
A number of people, none of whom knew Short, contacted police and the newspapers and claimed to have seen her during her so-called "missing week", between her January 9 disappearance and the discovery of her body, on January 15. Police and DA investigators ruled out each alleged sighting; in some cases, those interviewed were identifying other women whom they had mistaken for Short. Short's whereabouts in the days leading up to her murder and the discovery of her body are unknown.

After the discovery of Short's body, numerous Los Angeles newspapers printed headlines claiming she had been tortured leading up to her death. This was denied by law enforcement at the time, but they allowed the claims to circulate so as to keep Short's actual cause of death a secret from the public. Some sources, such as Oliver Cyriax's Crime: An Encyclopedia (1993), state that Short's body was covered in cigarette burns inflicted on her while she was still alive, though there is no indication of this in her official autopsy report.

In Severed, Gilmore states that the coroner who performed Short's autopsy suggested in conversation that she had been forced to consume feces based on his findings when examining the contents of her stomach. This claim has been denied by Harnisch and is also not indicated in Short's official autopsy, though it has been reprinted in several print and online media.

Nickname

According to newspaper reports shortly after the murder, Short received the nickname "Black Dahlia" from staff and patrons at a Long Beach drugstore in mid-1946 as wordplay on the film The Blue Dahlia (1946). Other popularly-circulated rumors claim that the media crafted the name because Short adorned her hair with dahlias. According to the FBI official website, she received the first part of the nickname from the press "for her rumored penchant for sheer black clothes".

However, reports by DA investigators state that the nickname was invented by newspaper reporters covering her murder; Herald-Express reporter Bevo Means, who interviewed Short's acquaintances at the drugstore, has been credited with first using the "Black Dahlia" name, though reporters Underwood and Jack Smith have been alternatively named as its creators. While some sources claim that Short was referred to or went by the name during her life, others dispute this. Both Gilmore and Harnisch agree that the name originated during Short's lifetime and was not a creation of the press: Harnisch states that it was in fact a nickname she earned from the staff of the Long Beach drugstore she frequented; in Severed, Gilmore names an A.L. Landers as the proprietor of the drugstore, though he does not provide the store's name. Prior to the circulation of the "Black Dahlia" name, Short's killing had been dubbed the "Werewolf Murder" by the Herald-Express because of the brutal nature of the crime.

Alleged prostitution and sexual history
Many true crime books claim that Short lived in or visited Los Angeles at various times in the mid-1940s, including Gilmore's Severed, which claims she worked at the Hollywood Canteen. This is disputed by Harnisch, who states that Short did not, in fact, live in Los Angeles until after the canteen's closing in 1945. Although some of her acquaintances and several authors and journalists described Short as a prostitute or call girl during her time in Los Angeles, according to Harnisch, the contemporaneous grand jury proved that there was no existing evidence that she was ever a prostitute. Harnisch claims that the rumor regarding Short's history as a prostitute originates from John Gregory Dunne's 1977 novel True Confessions, which is based in part on the crime.

Another widely circulated rumor (sometimes used to counter claims that Short was a prostitute) holds that Short was unable to have sexual intercourse because of a congenital defect that resulted in gonadal dysgenesis, also known as "infantile genitalia". Los Angeles County district attorney's files state that the investigators had questioned three men with whom Short had engaged in sex, including a Chicago police officer who was a suspect in the case; FBI files on the case also contain a statement from one of Short's alleged lovers. Short's autopsy itself, which was reprinted in full in Michael Newton's 2009 book The Encyclopedia of Unsolved Crimes, notes that her uterus was "small"; however, no other information in the autopsy is provided that would suggest her reproductive organs were anything other than anatomically normal. The autopsy also states that Short was not and had never been pregnant, contrary to what had been claimed prior to and following her death.

Another rumor—that Short was a lesbian—has often circulated; according to Gilmore, this rumor began after Bevo Means of the Herald-Express was told by the deputy coroner that Short "wasn't having sex with men" owing to her allegedly "small" genitalia. Means took this to mean that Short had sex with women, and both he and reporter Sid Hughes began fruitlessly investigating gay bars in Los Angeles for further information.

Legacy

Short is interred at the Mountain View Cemetery in Oakland. After her younger sisters had grown up and married, their mother, Phoebe, moved to Oakland to be near her daughter's grave. She finally returned to the East Coast in the 1970s, where she lived into her 90s. On February 2, 1947, just two weeks after Short's murder, Republican state assemblyman C. Don Field was prompted by the case to introduce a bill calling for the formation of a sex offender registry; the state of California would become the first U.S. state to make the registration of sex offenders mandatory.

Short's murder has been described as one of the most brutal and culturally enduring crimes in American history, and Time magazine listed it as one of the most infamous unsolved cases in the world.

Short's life and death have been the basis of numerous books, television shows, and films, both fictionalized and non-fiction. Among the most famous fictional accounts of Short's death is James Ellroy's 1987 novel The Black Dahlia, which, in addition to the murder, explored "the larger fields of politics, crime, corruption, and paranoia in post-war Los Angeles", according to cultural critic David M. Fine. Ellroy's novel was adapted into a 2006 film of the same name by director Brian De Palma: Short was played by actress Mia Kirshner. Both Ellroy's novel and its film adaptation bear little relation to the facts of the case. 

Short was also portrayed in heavily fictionalized accounts by Lucie Arnaz in the 1975 television film Who Is the Black Dahlia?, by Jessica Nelson in Season Four, Episode 13 of Hunter, and by Mena Suvari in the series American Horror Story in 2011, featuring Short in the plot line of the episode "Spooky Little Girl", and again in 2018 with "Return to Murder House".

See also
 Agness Underwood
 Crime in Los Angeles
 Ernest E. Debs
 List of unsolved murders

Notes

References

Sources

Further reading

External links

 The Black Dahlia – FBI
 The Black Dahlia case files from the Federal Bureau of Investigation's Freedom of Information Act site
 Somebody Knows episode, a 1950 radio program on the case
 

 
1924 births
1947 deaths
1947 murders in the United States
1947 in Los Angeles
20th-century American people
20th-century American women
American murder victims
American women civilians in World War II
Burials at Mountain View Cemetery (Oakland, California)
Crimes in Los Angeles
Deaths by beating in the United States
Deaths from bleeding
Female murder victims
People from Hyde Park, Boston
People from Medford, Massachusetts
People murdered in Los Angeles
Restaurant staff
Retail clerks
Unsolved murders in the United States
Vandenberg Space Force Base